Accidental Waltz is a 1990 Soviet romantic drama directed by Svetlana Proskurina. It won the Golden Leopard at the 1990 Locarno International Film Festival.

Plot
The life of Tatiana Prokofievna, an aging woman with a diva's behavior – is banal and dull. To escape the everyday slumber she seeks companionship of young men. She provides shelter and becomes involved in their problems. Her ex-boyfriend has married a younger woman. Tatjana is forced to keep her loneliness hidden because of her role as hostess.

Cast
Alla Sokolova – Tatjana Prokofievna
Aleksei Serebryakov – Sergei
Tatiana Bondariova – Nadia
Sergei Parapanov – Gena
Viktor Proskoerin – Viktor Stepanovitch

References

External links

Golden Leopard winners
1990 romantic drama films
Russian romantic drama films
1990 films
Soviet romantic drama films